"Friday's Child" is a song by British singer Will Young. It was written by Stephen Lee and Dina Taylor and produced by Stephen Lipson for Young's second studio album, Friday's Child (2003), based on original production by Lee. The song was released as the album's third single on 5 July 2004. "Friday's Child" reached number four on the UK Singles Chart and number 31 on the Irish Singles Chart.

Music video
A video for "Friday's Child" was directed by Dougal Wilson and inspired by Young's grandfather who swam in the Olympics. It depicts Young on his journey to ultimately becoming an Olympic Games swimmer. He is seen starting lessons with armbands and later with floats, then undertaking lifesaving lessons and doing time-trials with an instructor. At the second chorus he is seen taking part in a swimming race, which he wins. A representative for the Olympic Games is among the spectators and is seen holding a clipboard, which the camera zooms into paperwork on the clipboard bearing the question "Good enough for Olympics?" to which the 'yes' box is ticked. He later becomes the new Olympic champion when representing England at swimming in the Olympic Games. The last shots of the video depict him on the podium with a gold medal at the Olympics and later swimming the English Channel and being presented with a medal for his efforts.

Track listings

Notes
 denotes original producer(s)
 denotes remix producer(s)

Credits and personnel

 Tracy Ackerman – backing vocals
 Niall Acott – recording engineer
 Tim Cansfield – guitar
 Mark Feltham – harmonica
 Isobel Griffiths – orchestra contractor
 Nick Ingman – orchestal arranger
 Tim Jenkins – recording assistance

 Stephen Lee – harmonica, original producer, programming, writer
 Stephen Lipson – producer
 Heff Moraes – engineer
 Steve Price – recording engineer
 Dina Taylor – writer
 Phil Todd – flute solo
 Steven Wolf – drum programming

Charts

Weekly charts

Year-end charts

Release history

References

2003 songs
2004 singles
Bertelsmann Music Group singles
Song recordings produced by Stephen Lipson
Songs written by Steve Lee (songwriter)
Will Young songs